Bu'ale (Maay: Bu'aaly) is a town in the Middle Juba region of Somalia. It is the capital of the Bu'aale District as well as the de jure capital of the Jubaland State region, situated in the southern Jubba River valley. Bu'ale is also the capital of Middle Juba region.

Magaalada Bu,aalle ee caasimadda jubbada dhexe waxaa Taariikh ahaan daganaa Beesha Ajuuraan iyadoo ay jiraan beelo kale oo hadda sheegta lahaanshiyaha magaalada.

History 
Bu'ale was made the capital city for the Jubaland State of Somalia on 2 April 2013.

Since 2014 the town, along with Jilib and Jamame is under the control of militant Islamic extremist group Al-Shabaab.

References

Bu'aale

Populated places in Middle Juba